The 2019 Indian general election in Jammu and Kashmir was held for 6 seats in the state. The voting process was held in five phases on 11, 18, 23, 29 April and 6 May 2019.

Candidates

Result

Assembly segments wise lead of Parties

References

Indian general elections in Jammu and Kashmir
2010s in Jammu and Kashmir
2019 Indian general election by state or union territory